The 15th Annual Tony Awards took place on April 16, 1961, in the Waldorf-Astoria Grand Ballroom in New York City. The ceremony was broadcast on local television station WCBS-TV (Channel 2) in New York City. The Master of Ceremonies was Phil Silvers.

The ceremony
Presenters: Anna Maria Alberghetti, Anne Bancroft, Ray Bolger, Carol Channing, Henry Fonda, Joan Fontaine, Robert Goulet, Helen Hayes, Celeste Holm, Fredric March, Mary Martin, Helen Menken, Patricia Neal, Paul Newman, Geraldine Page, Sidney Poitier, Robert Preston, Jason Robards, Gig Young.

The performer was Eleanor Steber.

Music was by Meyer Davis and his Orchestra.

Winners and nominees
Winners are in bold

Special awards
David Merrick, in recognition of a fabulous production record over the last seven years.
Theatre Guild, for organizing the first repertory to go abroad for the State Department.

Multiple nominations and awards

These productions had multiple nominations:

8 nominations: Bye Bye Birdie  
7 nominations: Irma La Douce   
6 nominations: The Devil's Advocate   
5 nominations: All the Way Home, Becket, Camelot and Do Re Mi
4 nominations: Big Fish, Little Fish 
3 nominations: Tenderloin 
2 nominations: The Hostage, Period of Adjustment, Rhinocéros and 13 Daughters 

The following productions received multiple awards.

4 wins: Becket, Bye Bye Birdie and Camelot  
2 wins: Big Fish, Little Fish

References

External links
 Tony Awards Official Site

Tony Awards ceremonies
1961 in theatre
1961 awards
1961 in the United States
1961 in New York City
1961 awards in the United States
April 1961 events in the United States